Christina Najjar, also known as Tinx, is an American content creator and influencer. She began posting on TikTok during the COVID-19 pandemic and has dubbed herself "TikTok's older sister" due to her advice about relationships and mental health. She is known for her content around dating advice, celebrity commentary, and "starter packs for rich moms".

Early life 
Tinx was born in Washington, D.C. and raised in London, where she attended an all girls school. She moved to California when she was 19 to attend Stanford University, where she studied English literature and creative writing. After graduation, she worked at Gap Inc.'s retail management program. She later enrolled in Parsons School of Design's fashion journalism master's program.

Career 
Tinx started her TikTok account in the summer of 2020 during the COVID-19 pandemic. She acquired more than a million followers on the app within a year of starting her account, most of them female. She has been dubbed the "older sister" of TikTok in part due to her honesty about a variety of topics, including romance and mental health. She started gaining followers following her skits about being in your late 20s and celebrity gossip. Her content also includes dating advice and "starter packs for rich moms". On her content about rich moms, she said, “It’s half satire, half aspirational...Everybody hates the rich mom, the archetypal anal woman who doesn’t eat carbs and has the five-thousand-dollar stroller, but they’ll also say, ‘Ooh, I go to the same coffee shop as her.’ It’s the last group of people that you can safely poke fun at.” In January 2022, she released her rich mom branded apparel line "Rich Mom Gear".

Tinx was nominated for "Breakout Creator" at the 11th Streamy Awards.

Tinx signed with Sirius XM on February 21, 2022, to launch the "It's Me, Tinx" podcast on Stitcher Radio. And beginning on March 16, 2022, Tinx will host the weekly radio show "It’s Me, Tinx Live" on Sirius XM Stars and the SXM app. The shows will focus on Tinx's life and opinion on pop culture and relationships, including recommendations and advice on listener questions.

In April 2022, a series of controversial tweets posted by Tinx resurfaced on a thread in the sub-Reddit r/tinxsnark. The tweets were posted between 2012 and 2020 and were generally fat-phobic and misogynistic, targeting stars such as Kim Kardashian.

Brands and partnerships 
Tinx released a "Tinx bowl" in collaboration with Chipotle Mexican Grill in the United States and a smoothie at Erewhon Market. In April 2022, she played a receptionist as a part of H&M's Hôtel Hennes campaign.

Style and influences 
Her videos often employ a tiny microphone, choppy editing, and a deadpan voice.

Tinx cites Adam Sandler as her fashion inspiration.

Personal life 
Tinx has a brother.

References 

Year of birth missing (living people)
Stanford University alumni
Parsons School of Design alumni
American TikTokers
American talk radio hosts
American women podcasters
American podcasters